Thoughts Become Things is the first studio album by Markus Schulz under his alias Dakota and was released on 29 June 2009.

Re-Swirl, the ninth track, is a remake of a 1999 track Swirl.

Track listing
"Chinook" (09:05)
"Johnny the Fox" (07:33)
"Sin City" (08:03)
"The Doorway" (05:03)
"Koolhaus" (08:33)
"Steel Libido" (06:33)
"Lima" (07:40)
"Roxy '84" (08:03)
"Re-Swirl" (08:33)
"Mr. Cappuccino" (08:08)

References

2009 debut albums